Eleftherios Stefanoudakis (born 15 February 1949) is a Greek weightlifter. He competed at the 1972 Summer Olympics and the 1976 Summer Olympics.

References

1949 births
Living people
Greek male weightlifters
Olympic weightlifters of Greece
Weightlifters at the 1972 Summer Olympics
Weightlifters at the 1976 Summer Olympics
Sportspeople from Chania
20th-century Greek people
21st-century Greek people